Darman (also Drman, Dǎrman, Durman, Dorman) and Kudelin were two Bulgarian boyars of Cuman origin who jointly ruled the  regions of Braničevo and Kučevo (in modern Serbia) in the late 13th century (1273–1291). The two brothers used the weakened state of centralized administration in the region to become independent from the Kingdom of Hungary or the Second Bulgarian Empire in 1273. The capital of their domains was the fortress of Ždrelo, on the Mlava river. Relying on auxiliary troops that consisted mostly of Tatar and Cuman mercenaries, the brothers were “very independent-minded and afraid of no one”, according to Serbian archbishop Danilo II.

They regularly attacked their western neighbour, the Hungarian vassal Stefan Dragutin's Syrmian Kingdom, in Mačva, an area previously under the sovereignty of Elizabeth of Hungary. The Hungarian queen had sent troops to claim Braničevo in 1282–1284, but her forces were repelled and her vassal lands plundered in retaliation. Another campaign, this time organized by both Dragutin and Elizabeth, failed to conquer Darman and Kudelin's domains in 1285 and suffered another counter-raid by the brothers who managed to conquer Mačva in 1290, relying on Tatar mercenaries recruited on the Wallachian Plain with the approval of Tatar ruler Nogai. In 1292, after the Hungarians inflicted a defeat to the Tatars in the brothers' service on the banks of the Sava river during the winter, a joint force of Dragutin and his brother, the Serbian king Stefan Uroš II Milutin, managed to defeat Darman and Kudelin and conquered their region, which came for the first time under the rule of a Serb The brothers either flew to Nogai or were killed in this campaign, as they disappear from the historical sources thereafter.

Darman and Kudelin were relatives or close associates of the Bulgarian despotēs Shishman of Vidin, the founder of the Shishman dynasty of Bulgarian rulers, as he proceeded to attack the Serbian domains to his west, presumably as a response to Dragutin's conquest of the neighbouring Braničevo.

References

Sources

 
 
 
 
 
 

Medieval Bulgarian nobility
13th-century Bulgarian people
Medieval Bulgarian military personnel
13th century in Serbia
Braničevo District